is a Shinto shrine in the city of Toyokawa in eastern Aichi Prefecture, Japan. It is the ichinomiya of former Mikawa Province. The main festival of the shrine is held annually from May 3 to May 5. Located on the borderland of Aichi with Shizuoka Prefecture, the summit of Mount Hongū  is a sacred mountain considered to be within the precincts of the shrine, and has a subsidiary chapel.

Enshrined kami
The kami enshrined at Toga Shrine is:
  the god of nation-building, agriculture, medicine, and protective magic.
Beppyo shrines

History
The origins of Toga Shrine are unknown. The shrine claims to have been founded in the Taihō period (701-704 AD) by Emperor Mommu. It is located in an area of eastern Mikawa with a favorable climate, which has been settled since at least the Jōmon period. One of the treasures of the shrine is a Yayoi period  dōtaku bronze ritual object, possibly recovered from a burial mound in the area. The shrine first appears in historical documentation in the early Heian period Nihon Montoku Tennō Jitsuroku in an entry dated 850 and subsequently in the Nihon Sandai Jitsuroku in an entry dated 864. The shrine is mentioned as the ichinomiya of Mikawa Province in the 927 Engishiki records. During the Sengoku period, it was battleground between the forces of Tokugawa Ieyasu and the imagawa clan. It was given a small stipend of 100 koku by the Edo period Tokugawa shogunate.

The shrine is a five-minute walk from Mikawa-Ichinomiya Station on the JR East Iida Line

Gallery

See also
 List of Shinto shrines
 Ichinomiya

References

External links 

Aichi Prefecture official tourist information site 
Toyokawa city official homepage 

Shinto shrines in Aichi Prefecture
Toyokawa, Aichi
Mikawa Province
Ichinomiya